{{Automatic taxobox 
| image = Monomitopus agassizii.jpg
| image_caption = M. agassizii
| taxon = Monomitopus
| authority = Alcock, 1890
| type_species = Sirembo nigripinnis
| type_species_authority = Alcock 1889<ref name = CoF>{{Cof record|genid=4422|title=Monomitopus""|access-date=13 July 2018}}</ref>
}}Monomitopus is a genus of cusk-eels. They are oviparous.

Life cycle
Analysis of stable oxygen isotope composition of otoliths has shown that Monomitopus pallidus and Monomitopus kumae undergo an ontogenetic habitat shift, spending their early life pelagically in shallower waters, before descending to the deep-sea floor where they stay for rest of their lives.

Species
There are currently 14 recognized species in this genus:
 Monomitopus agassizii (Goode & T. H. Bean, 1896)
 Monomitopus americanus (J. G. Nielsen, 1971)
 Monomitopus conjugator (Alcock, 1896)
 Monomitopus garmani (H. M. Smith & Radcliffe, 1913)
 Monomitopus kumae D. S. Jordan & C. L. Hubbs, 1925
 Monomitopus longiceps H. M. Smith & Radcliffe, 1913
 Monomitopus magnus H. J. Carter & Cohen, 1985
 Monomitopus malispinosus (Garman, 1899)
 Monomitopus metriostoma (Vaillant, 1888)
 Monomitopus microlepis H. M. Smith & Radcliffe, 1913
 Monomitopus nigripinnis (Alcock, 1889)
 Monomitopus pallidus H. M. Smith & Radcliffe, 1913
 Monomitopus torvus Garman, 1899
 Monomitopus vitiazi'' (J. G. Nielsen, 1971) (Spearcheek cusk)

References

Ophidiidae
Marine fish genera
Taxa named by Alfred William Alcock